The Microsoft Learn Student Ambassadors (formerly called Microsoft Student Partners) is a program to sponsor students majoring in disciplines related to technology. The MSP (now MLSA) program enhances students' employability by offering training in skills not usually taught in academia, including knowledge of Microsoft technologies.

The program is available in most countries, and all students in college and university level are eligible to apply. If accepted, Student Ambassadors are assumed to further share the knowledge among the academic community by, for example, arranging courses, giving presentations, and initiating projects.

History
The MSP (now MLSA) program was initiated in 2001 and operated in fifteen countries for five years. In late 2006, the program was expanded to fifty countries worldwide, and as of July 2010, there are more than 2800 members worldwide across 101 countries and regions.

On July 20th, 2020, the program rebranded as the Microsoft Learn Student Ambassador program.

Purpose
The MLSA program is an educational and promotional program to sponsor undergraduate and postgraduate students majoring in disciplines related to technology, typically computer science, computer information systems, and information technology. MLSA program aims to enhance students' employability and increase students' awareness of Microsoft technologies. Student Ambassadors are offered training especially in product-specific skills not typically taught in academia.

The program aims to increase awareness of Microsoft products, programs and initiatives. Consequently, the program helps expanding the user base of Microsoft products, and results in better availability of properly educated workforce in those technologies.

Membership
The MLSA program is active around the world to college and university level students. Microsoft chooses few skilled students from each institution at a time to serve as representatives. Typically, a Microsoft Learn Student Ambassador is science major from engineering or business school of higher education.

Microsoft offers compensation to the members of the Student Ambassadors program through software and hardware packages which are distributed to them for testing and promotional purposes. Student Ambassadors are given access to Visual Studio Enterprise Subscriptions and Azure free credits to support their development and promotional activities. At times, Student Ambassadors are invited to technology-related conferences.

Activities
Student Ambassadors are given access to the latest Microsoft software, development tools, reference material, industry events, and training opportunities. MLSA's are assumed to further share the knowledge among the academic community by arranging courses; giving presentations and lectures; and initiating projects among the students. MLSA's  are also used to promote incentives, for example, the Microsoft Imagine Cup; and programs, such as the Ultimate Steal and its affiliate program. Some Student Ambassadors (based on a selection criteria) are provided internships and job opportunities at a few Microsoft Divisions through the program.

Local MLSA activities include, for example, attending the Student Technology Day in UK, which included high-profile presentations, such as one by the CEO of Microsoft, Satya Nadella; and TechDays, for instance in France, and in Canada. In New Zealand, the MLSA developed a programmed called the Microsoft Student Accelerator (MSA), which aims to not only train the students throughout the year but also place the students in various internship programmes over the summer.

See also
 Imagine Cup
 DreamSpark
 MSDN Academic Alliance
 Microsoft Certified Professional
 Microsoft Developer Network
 Microsoft Most Valuable Professional
 Microsoft Research

Notes

References

External links
 Official website
 Microsoft Student Partners UK
 Microsoft Student Partners Russia 

Microsoft initiatives
Academia